Capital punishment is a legal penalty in Indonesia. Although the death penalty is enforced only in grave cases of premeditated murder, Corruption, it is regularly applied to some drug traffickers. Executions are carried out by firing squad.

History
Though the death penalty existed as a punishment from the inception of the Republic of Indonesia, the first judicial execution did not take place until 1973.

The first civilian execution in Indonesia was performed in 1978. Oesin Bestari, a goat butcher from Mojokerto was the first criminal condemned with death penalty in Post-independence Indonesia. He was convicted in 1964 after murdered six persons, with all of his victims were his business partners. He was executed on 14 September 1978 in a section of Kenjeran Beach, Surabaya.

The second person executed was Henky Tupanwael, a street martial artist-turned-armed robber. He was convicted in 1969 after a series of armed robberies in 1944, 1957, 1960, and 1963. He also notable prison escapist, with three records of prison escapes. He was executed on 5 January 1980 at government gunnery range in Pamekasan, Madura Island. His execution was notable to feature popular Indonesian superstition at that time to deal with black magic practitioner possessing weapon immunity and delicate process to execute him. At his time of execution, government officials treated his place of death with unusual process. His execution pillar was bedded with kelor leaves and arranged in some way so his body dropped directly at the bed. Aside of black cloth to cover his eyes, red cloth was used instead. He also pinioned using coarse palm fiber ropes, but not tied to the pillar to ensure his body dropped to the kelor leaves bed. All was done by government officials to neutralize his immunity and make sure he died in the process.

The third person executed was Waluyo a.k.a. Kusni Kasdut, a former hero-turned-armed robber. Kusni Kasdut case was attracted significant media circus at that time, due to he was a hero of Indonesian National Revolution and his Robin Hood style robbery as he was committed robbery for distributing his gain to the poor. He was executed on 16 February 1980 somewhere near Gresik City, East Java.

The Indonesian government does not issue detailed statistics about every person facing the death penalty in the country. In fact, "the search for precise figures is hampered by prevailing state secrecy over the death penalty." There were no executions in 2017, 2018, 2019, 2020, and 2021 and none have been scheduled for 2022, possibly as a result of intense and widespread international criticism the Indonesian government had to face for carrying out the last executions. President Joko Widodo has since stated that he is now open to reintroducing an official moratorium on the death penalty. Indonesia is well-noted as "a strong advocate against the death penalty for its citizens abroad."

Historical use of hanging 
Despite Indonesia using Law No. 2/PNPS/1964 that mandated execution by firing squad, until 2023, Article No. 11 of Indonesia Criminal Code still mandated that execution must be performed by hanging and the part remain written in the code. This part is piece of law of colonial era, as Indonesian Criminal Code inherited from Dutch East Indies Criminal Code, but the article already superseded by Law No. 2/PNPS/1964 in practice. During Dutch colonial era, execution performed by public hanging at town park and quite barbaric in nature, because the hanging performed by short drop hanging, in which 3 executioners played their role in the death of the condemned prisoner, one for opening trap door, one for pulling the leg, and another one for pushing the prisoner's shoulder below, so the condemned prisoner death hastened. The hanging also often not employed hood, as recorded by Dutch chronicler Justus van Maurik which recorded the execution scenes in his 1897 book "Indrukken van een “Totok,” Indische type en schetsen". One condemned prisoner, even experienced "horrific facial changes, bulged eyes, extremely protruding tongue, and blood discharge from body orifices" during this kind of hanging as recorded by him. Since the 1915 revision (Staatsblad 1915 No. 732), the latest revision of Dutch East Indies Criminal Code, the hanging using long drop method instead of short drop. The effect, however, only applied to the criminals sentenced after 1918. After the independence of Indonesia, the Dutch East Indies Criminal Code turned into Indonesian Criminal Code by passage of Law No. 1/1946 (Regulations of Criminal Laws), with many changes of irrelevant aspects of the former Dutch East Indies to Indonesia. However, the hanging part still retained and enshrined at the Article No. 11 of both the former Dutch East Indies Criminal Code and the later Indonesia Criminal Code.

The hanging later replaced after Indonesia fell into Japanese Occupation Forces during World War II. The Japanese Occupation Forces government issued Osamu Gunrei No. 1/1942 (Punishments in Accordance with the Law of the Armies) on 2 March 1942, which mandated that executions throughout Indonesia be performed by means of shooting. During the turbulence of the Indonesian National Revolution which resulted into divided territorial control of Indonesia between Netherlands-controlled and Indonesian controlled areas, the execution process divided also. In areas controlled with Netherlands occupation forces, the Netherlands Indies Civil Administration issued Staatsblad 1945 No. 123 (On Capital Punishment), which mandated execution with fire squad to condemned criminals, while in Indonesia-controlled areas used hanging to execute the condemned criminals. After the recognition of Indonesian independence, the criminal code still split into two between the Indonesian-controlled areas and areas formerly controlled NICA until 1958. Due to this, on 20 September 1958, the Indonesia Government issued Law No. 73/1958, to impose Law No. 1/1946 to all Indonesia, and since then Indonesia using hanging. The use of hanging retained from 1958 to 1964. On 27 April 1964, Law No. 2/PNPS/1964 issued to replace hanging with execution by firing squad. Although the Article No. 11 of Indonesia Criminal Code no longer used since 1964 to present time, the article however used to very extraordinary cases. The last known recorded hangings was applied to the Komando Jihad ringleaders, Imran bin Muhammad Zein, Salman Hafidz, and Maman Kusmayadi for their involvements in Cicendo incident [id] and subsequent Garuda Indonesia Flight 206 Hijacking, firsts of jihadism-motivated terrorism acts in Indonesia. They were sentenced under very harsh anti-subversion law Law No. 11/PNPS/1963 (On Eradication of Subversive Activities) in 1981 and sent to gallows. With this law, Imran was executed in late 1983, Salman in early February 1985, and finally Maman on 12 September 1986. All of them executed at classified government facility somewhere at the foot of Tangkuban Perahu, West Java. The Law No.11/PNPS/1963 was notable as one of harshest laws ever made in Indonesia, as it ignored Lex posteriori derogat legi priori and Lex specialis derogat legi generali doctrines to any subversive activities and any activities deemed to be threatening the ruling government (written explicitly in Article No. 19, Law No. 11/PNPS/1963) and enabling the government to impose the harshest possible punishments for said activities (Article No. 13, Law No. 11/PNPS/1963), enabling hanging to be applied for criminals convicted in subversion acts. The Law No. 11/PNPS/1963 itself repealed by Law No. 26/1999 on 19 May 1999, 13 years after the last hanging.

Hanging is removed from the new 2023 Indonesian Criminal Code. The law only mandated the execution must be performed by shooting only.

Legal process

Use of execution by firing squad 
Prisoners spend often a long time in prison before their sentence is finally carried out. Usually, their final appeal has been exhausted through the trial court, two appellate courts, and consideration of clemency by the President.

Prisoners executed by firing squad, as mandated by Law No. 2/PNPS/1964. The law applied for civilian and military execution.

Prisoners are woken up in the middle of the night and taken to a remote (and undisclosed) location and executed by firing squad. The method has not changed since 1964.

The prisoner states their final request which the prosecutor may grant when deemed feasible and do not obstruct the execution process.

The blindfolded prisoner is led to a grassy area where they have an option to sit or stand. The firing squad is composed of 12 soldiers, who shoot at the prisoner from a range of five to ten meters, aiming at the heart. Only three fire live bullets and the rest fire blanks. If the prisoner survives the shot, the commander is required to shoot the prisoner in the brain with his own weapon. The procedure is repeated until a doctor confirms no signs of life remain.

Possible changes from death sentence to imprisonment 
The new 2023 Indonesian Criminal Code opened possible changes from death sentence to imprisonment. Article 100 of the 2023 Code mandated the judge to give 10 years probationary period to a criminal sentenced with death sentence considering the criminal is remorseful and his role in the crime worth to be sentenced for death. After 10 years, his/her sentence can be commuted to the imprisonment for life. In addition, if the capital punishment is not carried after 10 years after the clemency proposal from the criminal rejected by the president, his/her sentence can be commuted to the imprisonment for life.

Constitutionality
In 2007, the Indonesian Constitutional Court upheld the constitutionality of the death penalty for drug cases, by a vote of six to three. The case was brought by prisoners sentenced to death for drug crimes, including some of the Bali Nine, a group of Australian citizens sentenced to prison and the death penalty for drug trafficking in Bali in 2005.

Statutory provisions
The following is a list of the criminal offences that carry the death penalty in Indonesia:

Criminal offences punishable by death based on Indonesia Criminal Code 
Indonesian Criminal Code (Indonesian: Kitab Undang-Undang Hukum Pidana, KUHP or KUHP 2023), Law No. 1/2023 listed several criminal offences which can be punishable by death: 
Committing treasonous acts with intent to kill or deprive the President or Vice-President of his or her life or liberty or to render him or her unfit to govern (KUHP 2023 Art. 191)
Committing treasonous acts with intent to make a part of whole Indonesia regions fall into foreign powers or inciting separation of Indonesia regions from Indonesia (KUHP 2023 Art. 192)
Committing treasonous acts by aiding or protecting Indonesia's enemies at war by means of:
Aiding Indonesia's enemies at war by committing treachery, relinquishing of / destroying of / damaging of military installations or military posts, transportation facilities, war logistic storages, or military war funding of the Armed Forces, included also attempts to hindering, obstructing, or failing tactical strategies for attack and defense (KUHP 2023 Art. 212, verse 3, point a)
Causing or facilitating riot, rebellion, desertion in the body of Armed Forces (KUHP 2023 Art. 212, verse 3, point b).
The meaning of treasonous act in KUHP 2023 Art. 160 are the intention to carry out the attack has been realized by the preparation of the act. Which means it only defines treasonous act if there happens to be a premeditated conflict from the alleged separatists. Those who have sympathy for separatism or raise the Morning Star flag will not automatically be charged for treason. 
Premeditated murder (KUHP Art. 459)
Aviation crimes and crimes against aviation facilities/infrastructures resulted in deaths or destruction of the airplane, especially (KUHP 2023 Art. 588, verse 2):
Violence acts against people on board of the airplane. 
Placing tools or goods, or causing the placement of such tools or goods capable to inflict damage to the airplane (either in civilian flight or state/service flight)
Committing genocide or taking part on genocidal acts against a nation, race, ethnic, religion, or belief (KUHP 2023 Art. 598) by heinous acts of:
Killing the member of the nation, race, ethnic, religion, or belief. 
Causing immense physical and mental suffering to the nation, race, ethnic, religion, or belief.
Causing situation to unfit for living to the nation, race, ethnic, religion, or belief.
Forcing acts causing birth cancellation or reproduction inhibition of the member of the nation, race, ethnic, religion, or belief.
Forcing child transportation by force removal.
Systematic killing, eradication, banishment, force resident removal, liberty deprivation, and other internationally agreed crimes listed as crimes against humanity against civilian and committing apartheid (KUHP 2023 Art. 599, point a).
Acts of terrorisms (KUHP 2023 Art. 600), including:
Causing wide-spread terror and fearful situation. 
Terror acts resulted in mass kills. 
Terror acts resulted in mass liberty deprivation.
Terror acts resulted in mass loss of life or property/properties.
Terror acts resulted in destruction of national vital objects, environment, public facilities, and international facilities.
Unlawful acts related to narcotics:
Farming exceeding 5 trees of drugs producing plants or farming resulting in more than 1 kilogram material of drug plant matters, or producing, importing, exporting, and/or distributing of Class I Narcotics exceeding 5 grams of drug material in chemical form (KUHP 2023 Art. 610, section 2, point a).
Producing, importing, exporting, and/or distributing of Class II Narcotics exceeding 5 grams of drug material in chemical form (KUHP 2023 Art. 610, section 2, point b).

Criminal offences punishable by death based on Laws aside to Indonesia Criminal Code 
Following criminal offences are not regulated in Indonesia Criminal Code, but in other laws. Violation of these criminal offences resulted in punishment by death. Some of the offences here were eventually moved to the newly coded 2023 Indonesian Criminal Code or given lesser sentences by the new Criminal Code. 
Economic crimes with the intent to hindering/obstructing government programs related in the matters of: (1) food and clothing, (2) national and public security, and (3) against national interest in countering economy imperialism and separatism in West Papua (Law No. 5/PNPS/1959). The economic crimes at that time were including the acts of (1) Smuggling, (2) Customs fraud, (3) Banking crimes, (4) Commercial crimes, (5) Securities crimes, (6) Financing and financial service crimes, (7) Brand counterfeiting, (8) Environmental crimes resulted in environmental damages which affected economy of population, (9) Corruption, (10) Economic criminal acts resulted in threatening national security, and (11) Economic criminal acts resulted in damages to Head of State's dignity.
Economic crimes with the intent to disturb food and clothing distribution and equipment to produce food and clothing resulted in national wide chaos and disturbance in national economic system (Government Regulation in Lieu of Law No. 21/1959). The economic crimes at that time were including the acts of (1) Smuggling, (2) Customs fraud, (3) Banking crimes, (4) Commercial crimes, (5) Securities crimes, (6) Financing and financial service crimes, (7) Brand counterfeiting, and (8) Environmental crimes resulted in environmental damages which affected economy of population in which the criminal acts deliberately done with ill intentions, threatening and disadvantaging public interests, and the act performed for gaining enormous financial gains and advantages. 
Corruption under "certain circumstances," including repeat offenders and corruption committed during times of national emergency/disaster (Law No. 31/1999 on Corruption)
Gross violations of human rights (Law No. 26/2000 on Human Rights Courts), including:
 Attempting and conspiring genocide and crimes against humanity.
 Being military commander (for military) or being leader or supervisor (for civilian) responsible to genocide and crimes against humanity.
Encouraging or responsible in supervising children to actively contribute and/or involved in producing or distributing drugs (Law No. 23/2002 on Children Protection).
Terrorisms (Law No 15/2003 as amended by Law No. 5/2018)
Unlawful import, producing, distributing, accepting, possessing, and hiding weapons, firearms, ammunitions, and explosives for terrorism purposes.
Using CBRN weapons for terrorism, including chemical, biological, and radiological and nuclear.
Planning and encouraging people to commit terrorism.
Attempting, conspiring, and assisting terrorism acts.
Providing information and assistance from outside Indonesia to terrorism acts.
Using force or threatened to use violent force.
Unlawful import, producing, distributing, accepting, possessing, and hiding CBRN weapons for terrorism purposes.
Sexual Assault against multiple victims (more than 1 victim) resulted in serious injury, mental disability, infecting victims with venereal diseases, causing damages to or causing dysfunction of the victim's reproductive system, and/or resulted to death of the victim (Law No. 23/2002 as amended by Law No. 17/2016)
Development, production, obtaining, transfer or use of chemical weapons (Law No. 9/2008 relating to chemical weapons, Art. 14 and 27)

Offences punishable by death based on Indonesia Military Criminal Code 
Indonesia Military Criminal Code (Indonesian: Kitab Undang-Undang Hukum Pidana Militer) is Staatsblad 1934 No. 167 and revised and amended several times with (1) Law No. 39/1947, (2) Law No. 5/1950, and (3) Law No. 31/1997. It listed several offences that punishable by death. The offences are:

 Assisting enemies and causing disadvantage to Indonesia (KUHPM Art. 64).
 Participating in Rebellion (KUHPM Art. 65).
 Espionage (KUHPM Art. 67).
 Betraying promises during war and plotting conspiration (KUHPM Art. 68).
 Deliberately surrendered himself/herself to the enemy (KUHPM Art. 73).
 Deliberately surrendered during the war without giving strict orders and suppressed the fighting spirit and disrupted the military community (KUHPM Art. 74).
 Committing serious criminal acts during his/her time as military commander, manager, or supervisor (KUHPM Art. 76).
 Breaking pact or treaty or agreement made with the enemy and acted against the law and siding with the enemy (KUHPM Art. 82).
 Desertion in war (KUHPM Art. 89).
 Committing rebellion in peaceful period, desertion, and neglect the prevention of war or crime while he/she actually able to prevent it (KUHPM Art. 133).
 Deliberately committed violent acts to a person or a group (KUHPM Art. 137).
 Deliberately committed violent acts to the dead, sick, and/or wounded in war (KUHPM Art. 138).

Criminal offences formerly punishable by death 

 Subversion (Law No. 11/PNPS/1963, repealed by Law No. 26/1999). The law repealed due to historical use against anti-Soekarnoists and anti-Soehartoists, causing the perpetuation of both Old Order and New Order government. Repealed as part of the Reformation after the Fall of Suharto.
 Espionage and leaking information of state atomic secrets (Law No. 31/PNPS/1964, repealed by Law No. 10/1997). The law changed from death sentence to the imprisoned for life.
 Unlawful import, producing, distributing, accepting, possessing, hiding, exporting from Indonesia, and misuse of firearms and/or other explosives (Emergency Law No. 12/1951). The penalty eventually changed to the 7 to 15 years imprisonment under the 2023 Indonesian Criminal Code (KUHP 2023 Art. 306 and 307).
 Informing the positions of military installations or posts, transportation facilities, logistic storages, or military war funding of the Armed Forces (KUHP Art. 124 section 2, point a). In KUHP 2023 such crimes will be given 15 years imprisonment (KUHP 2023 Art. 212, verse 2).
 Committing fraud in delivery of military materials in time of war. In old KUHP, such crimes will be punishable by death (KUHP Art. 127). In KUHP 2023, such crimes will be given 5 years imprisonment (KUHP 2023 Art. 214).
 Deadly acts against the head of state of a friendly state, either directly killing or involved in seditious/treasonous acts resulted in death. In old KUHP, such crimes will be punishable by death (KUHP Art. 140, section 2 and 3). In KUHP 2023, such crimes will be given 12 years imprisonment (KUHP 2023 Art. 224).
 Gang robbery resulted in death (KUHP Art 365). In KUHP 2023, the act will be given 15 years imprisonment if committed alone and given 20 years imprisonment if committed together with conspiracy (KUHP 2023 Art. 479, verse 3 and 4).
 Piracy resulting in death (KUHP Art. 444). In KUHP 2023, the act will be given 12 years imprisonment (KUHP 2023 Art. 542).
 Unlawful seizure or defending the seizure or attempting to taking control an airplane in flight, without force and with force, and if the act were: (1) committed by 2 persons or more together, (2) as continuation of a conspiration, (3) premeditated, (4) causing grave injury to a person or persons, (5) damaging the airplane and threatening the passengers and the flight, and (6) carried out with the intention of depriving someone of one's freedom or continuing to deprive someone of one's freedom (KUHP Art. 479k section 2). In KUHP 2023, the act will be given 15 years imprisonment if resulted in death but without destruction of the airplane and 20 years imprisonment if resulted in death and destruction of the airplane (KUHP 2023 Art. 580, verse 1 and 2).

Execution statistics

Executions in Indonesia during and after Suharto era:

Foreign nationals
The people on death row include foreign nationals, all but one of whom were convicted of drug-related offences. These foreign inmates come from 18 different countries: Australia, Brazil, Mainland China, France, Ghana, India, Iran, Malawi, Malaysia, Netherlands, Nigeria, Pakistan, Philippines, Senegal, Sierra Leone, the United Kingdom, the United States, Vietnam and Zimbabwe.

References

Indonesia
Murder in Indonesia
Law of Indonesia
Human rights abuses in Indonesia